Mezgovci is a small settlement in the Slovene Hills in the Municipality of Sveti Tomaž in northeastern Slovenia. The area traditionally belonged to the Styria region and is now included in the Drava Statistical Region.

The village roadside chapel with a belfry was built in 1905.

References

External links
Mezgovci on Geopedia

Populated places in the Municipality of Sveti Tomaž